Dmitry Dmitryevich Borisov (born August 15, 1985, Chernivtsi, Ukrainian SSR) is a Russian journalist, TV host on Channel One Russia, a Runet activist, producer of documentary projects and (since 2015) chief executive producer of Channel One Russia Worldwide. He has won a TEFI award as the best TV news presenter (2016, 2017).

He started work for the radio station Echo of Moscow when he was 16 (2001). In 2006 he joined Channel One Russia as a news anchor.

In 2008, he was awarded the Channel One prize for best TV presenter.

From 2011 until August 2017, he hosted The Evening News and Vremya.

He was one of the Sochi Games torchbearers 2014 Winter Olympics torch relay.

In 2014, for his contribution to the preparation and holding of the XXII Olympic Winter Games in Sochi  awarded Medal of the Order "For Merit to the Fatherland" 1st class.

References

External links 
 Страничка о Дмитрии Борисове на сайте Первого канала
 Дмитрий Борисов на сайте Эхо Москвы
 @ddb1

1985 births
Living people
Mass media people from Chernivtsi
Russian television presenters
Russian television talk show hosts
Echo of Moscow radio presenters
Recipients of the Medal of the Order "For Merit to the Fatherland" I class
Russian State University for the Humanities alumni